Jalal Talebi (born 23 March 1942) is a retired Iranian football player and manager.

Playing career
Talebi had a very short playing career in which he played for Daraei, Taj (Esteghlal) and the Iran national football team, for which he played three matches at the 1964 Summer Olympics, and won the 1968 AFC Asian Cup. He was known for his heads up plays, his jumping abilities and his skills with the ball. A meniscus injury ended his playing career at age of 27.

International goals

Managerial career
Talebi attended Chelsea coaching school in England for several months between 1971 and 1973. He coached the Iran national under-20 football team from 1976 to 1978.

Talebi had coached soccer at De Anza Community College. He was the head coach of the Iranian national team during the 1998 FIFA World Cup. Prior to the tournament, he was appointed to replace Tomislav Ivic. He had held the position of technical director before he was named as head coach. He stepped down as head coach after the 1998 FIFA World Cup on 20 August 1998, but returned to lead the team again during 2000 Asian Cup in Lebanon. He resigned after Iran's elimination in the tournament.

Talebi has also managed Geylang United of S.League in 1996, Indonesian Olympic Team from 1996 to 1997, Syria national football team from 2001 to 2002, and Al Taliya from 2005 to 2006.

Coaching career statistics

Personal life
Talebi lives in Palo Alto, California, with his wife and three sons. He moved to the United States in 1983.

Honours

Player
Daraei
Tehran Championship (1): 1961

Taj
Iranian League (1): 1970–71
Tehran Championship (1): 1970, 1971
Asian Club Championship (1): 1970

Manager
Geylang United
S.League (1): 1996
Singapore FA Cup (1): 1996

Iran
West Asian Football Federation Championship (1): 2000

References

External links 

 

Olympic footballers of Iran
Footballers at the 1964 Summer Olympics
Iranian footballers
Esteghlal F.C. players
Association football midfielders
Iran international footballers
Iranian football managers
Iran national football team managers
Syria national football team managers
1998 FIFA World Cup managers
2000 AFC Asian Cup managers
Iranian expatriates in the United States
People from Tehran
Living people
1942 births
Geylang International FC head coaches
Asian Games silver medalists for Iran
Asian Games medalists in football
Footballers at the 1966 Asian Games
Iran national under-20 football team managers
Medalists at the 1966 Asian Games